Richard Newman (7 April 1871 – 3 June 1961) was the Archdeacon of Blackburn from 1936 to 1946.

He was educated at Hereford Cathedral School and Brasenose College, Oxford. He began his ecclesiastical career with curacies in Nottingham and New Mills.  he held incumbencies in Goodshaw,  Whalley, Accrington  and Preston before his Archdeacon’s appointment.

He died at Hythe, Kent on 3 June 1961.

References

1871 births
1961 deaths
People educated at Hereford Cathedral School
Alumni of Brasenose College, Oxford
Archdeacons of Blackburn